The Ling-Temco-Vought (LTV) XC-142 was a tri-service tiltwing experimental aircraft designed to investigate the operational suitability of vertical/short takeoff and landing (V/STOL) transports. An XC-142A first flew conventionally on 29 September 1964, and on 11 January 1965, it completed its first transitional flight by taking off vertically, changing to forward flight and finally landing vertically. Its service sponsors pulled out of the program one by one, and it eventually ended due to a lack of interest after demonstrating its capabilities successfully.

Development
In 1959 the United States Army, Navy and Air Force began work on the development of a prototype V/STOL aircraft that could augment helicopters in transport-type missions. Specifically they were interested in designs with longer range and higher speeds than existing helicopters, in order to support operations over longer distances, or in the case of the United States Marine Corps, from further offshore. On 27 January 1961, a series of DOD actions resulted in an agreement where all of the military services would work on the Tri-Service Assault Transport Program under the Navy's Bureau of Naval Weapons (BuWeps) leadership.

However, for the Marine Corps mission, the requirement stated that the fuel load could be reduced so that the maximum gross weight would not exceed , as long as a  radius was maintained.

Vought responded with a proposal combining engineering from their own design arm, as well as Ryan and Hiller, who had more extensive helicopter experience. Their proposal won the design contest, and a contract for five prototypes was signed in early 1962 with first flight specified for July 1964. The design was initially known as the Vought-Ryan-Hiller XC-142, but when Vought became part of the LTV conglomerate this naming was dropped.

During the prototype development the Navy decided to exit the program. They were concerned that the strong propeller downwash would make it difficult to operate.

The first prototype made its first conventional flight on 29 September 1964, first hover on 29 December 1964, and first transition on 11 January 1965. The first XC-142A was delivered to the Air Force test team in July 1965. During the XC-142A program, a total of 420 hours were flown in 488 flights. The five XC-142As were flown by 39 different military and civilian pilots. Tests included carrier operations, simulated rescues, paratroop drops, and low-level cargo extraction.

During testing the aircraft's cross-linked driveshaft proved to be its Achilles heel. The shaft resulted in excessive vibration and noise, resulting in a high pilot workload. Additionally, it proved susceptible to problems due to wing flexing. Shaft problems, along with operator errors, resulted in a number of hard landings causing damage. One crash occurred as a result of a failure of the driveshaft to the tail rotor, causing three fatalities. One of the limitations found in the aircraft was an instability between wing angles of 35 and 80 degrees, encountered at extremely low altitudes. There were also high side forces which resulted from yaw and weak propeller blade pitch angle controls. The new "2FF" propellers also proved to generate less thrust than predicted.

Design

The basic design was fairly typical for a cargo aircraft, consisting of a large boxy fuselage with a tilted rear area featuring a loading ramp. The wing was high-mounted and the tail surfaces were a "semi-T-tail" to keep the rear area clear during loading. Tricycle landing gear were used, with the main legs retracting into blisters on the fuselage sides. In normal parked configuration it would appear to be a conventional cargo plane.

For V/STOL operations, the aircraft "converted" by tilting its wing to the vertical. Roll control during hover was provided by differential clutching of the propellers, while yaw used the ailerons, which were in the airflow. For pitch control the aircraft featured a separate tail rotor, oriented horizontally to lift the tail, as opposed to the more conventional anti-torque rotors on helicopters that are mounted vertically. When on the ground, the tail rotor folded against the tail to avoid being damaged during loading. The wing could be rotated to 100 degrees, past vertical, in order to hover in a tailwind.

The C-142 was powered by four General Electric T64 turboshaft engines cross-linked on a common driveshaft, which eliminated engine-out asymmetric thrust problems during V/STOL operations, to drive four  Hamilton Standard fiberglass propellers. Compared to conventional designs it was overpowered: it had 0.27 hp/lb, compared to 0.12 hp/lb for the contemporary Lockheed C-130D Hercules.

Operational history

The aircraft never proceeded beyond the prototype stage. In 1966, while tests were still underway, the Air Force requested a proposal for a production version, the C-142B. Since the Navy had backed out by this time, the Navy carrier compatibility requirement could be eliminated, which dramatically reduced the empty weight. Other changes proposed for this version included a streamlined cockpit, larger fuselage, upgraded engines and simplified engine maintenance.

After reviewing the C-142B proposal, the tri-services management team could not develop a requirement for a V/STOL transport. XC-142A testing ended, and the remaining flying copy was turned over to NASA for research testing from May 1966 to May 1970.

A civilian version, the Downtowner, was also proposed. This was designed to carry 40–50 passengers at a cruise speed of  using only two of its engines.

Survivors
Of the five aircraft built, only one still survives.
XC-142A (AF Ser. No. 62-5924) is on display in the fourth building of the National Museum of the United States Air Force at Wright-Patterson Air Force Base near Dayton, Ohio. It was flown to the museum in 1970 and moved from the experimental aircraft hangar to the fourth building of the museum's main complex in November 2015.

Specifications (XC-142A)

See also

References
Notes

Bibliography

 Markman, Steve and William G. Holder. Straight Up A History of Vertical Flight. Atglen, PA: Schiffer Publications, 2000. .
 Taylor, John W. R. Jane's All The World's Aircraft 1965–1966. London: Sampson Low, Marston & Company, 1965.

Further reading

External links

 Factsheet at the National Museum of the United States Air Force
 XC-142
  (begins at 2:17 mark)
 Operation Suitability Tests. Film donated by the Ryan Aeronautical Company to the San Diego Air and Space Museum in the 1990s. 

C-142
1960s United States military transport aircraft
C-142, Ling-Temco-Vought
Four-engined tractor aircraft
High-wing aircraft
Tiltwing aircraft
Four-engined turboprop aircraft
NASA aircraft
Aircraft first flown in 1964